August Bausch (2 March 1818 – 28 February 1909) was a German genre, portrait and history painter of the Düsseldorf school of painting.

Life 

Bausch came from Bonn to the Kunstakademie Düsseldorf. From 1835 to 1839, Karl Ferdinand Sohn was his teacher there. After his studies, he worked in Düsseldorf and Bonn. In1839, he exhibited the picture Abraham and Isaac's sacrifice in Frankfurt. As a history painter, he attracted the attention of the art professor Rudolf Wiegmann with his paintings Gretchen and Martha (after Goethe's Faust) (1841) and Tempelritter auf der Morgenwache (1843). However, Bausch made a name for himself as a portrait painter and portrait draughtsman in his home town of Bonn, where he especially created portraits of students, mainly that of his nephew Hermann Deiters. Also well-known is his portrait of the astrologer Friedrich Wilhelm August Argelander from Bonn, painted around 1868.

Work 
 Der Heilige Servatius im Bischofsornat, 1840
 Orientalische Hafenstadt mit Dschunke und chinesischen Händlerbooten, Öl auf Platte, 32 × 46 cm

Further reading 
 Hermann Board: Bausch, August. In Ulrich Thieme, Felix Becker (ed.): Thieme-Becker. Established by Ulrich Thieme and Felix Becker.. Vol. 3: Bassano–Bickham. Wilhelm Engelmann, Leipzig 1909,  (Textarchiv – Internet Archive).
 Hans Paffrath / Museum Kunstpalast (ed.): Lexikon der Düsseldorfer Malerschule. Vol. 1, F. Bruckmann, Munich 1997, Anhang, p. 439.

References 

German history painters
German genre painters
German portrait painters
German draughtsmen
1818 births
1909 deaths
Artists from Bonn